The Harry H. Goode Memorial Award is an IEEE Computer Society annual awards in honor of Harry H. Goode for achievements in the information processing field which are considered either a single contribution of theory, design, or technique of outstanding significance, or the accumulation of important contributions on theory or practice over an extended time period, the total of which represent an outstanding contribution.

Recipients 
Recipients include:

See also 

 List of computer science awards

References

External links 
 Harry H. Goode Memorial Award - IEEE Computer Society. Info and winner list.
 IEEE Computer Society Award List. Small info about the award.

Computer science awards
IEEE society and council awards